Mercedes-Benz has sold a number of automobiles with the "320" model name:

 1937—1942 W142
 1937—1942 Typ 320
 1937—1938 Typ 320N (shorter wheelbase)
 1993—1995 W124
 1993—1995 E320
 1994—1995 E320A
 1993—1998 W140
 1993—1998 S320/S320L
 1994—2001 R129
 1994—2001 SL320
 1995 W210
 1995 E320
 1998 C208
 1998 CLK320
 1998–2005 W163
 1998–2005 ML320
 2000–2011 W203
2000–2007 C320 Sport Coupe
2008–2011 CLC320 Sport Coupe
 1999—2005 W220
 1999—2005 S320/S320 CDI
 2006—2013 W221
 2006—2013 S320/S320 CDI
 2006–2011 W164
 2006–2011 ML320
 2011–2019 W166
 2011–2019 ML320 (GL320 2015–2019)
 2019–present W167
 2019–present GL320

See also 

 Mercedes-Benz 320A (1938-42)

320